|}

This is a list of electoral district results for the Victorian 1958 election.

Results by electoral district

Albert Park 

 Two party preferred vote was estimated.

Ballarat North

Ballarat South

Balwyn 

 Two party preferred vote was estimated.

Benalla 

 Two party preferred vote between Country and Labor was estimated.

Benambra 

 Two party preferred vote was estimated.

Bendigo

Box Hill 

 Two party preferred vote was estimated.

Brighton

Broadmeadows

Brunswick East 

 Two party preferred vote was estimated.

Brunswick West 

 Two party preferred vote was estimated.

Burwood

Camberwell 

 Two party preferred vote was estimated.

Caulfield 

 Two party preferred vote was estimated.

Coburg 

 Mutton was elected as an Independent in the 1955 election, but joined the Labor party in 1956.
 Two party preferred vote was estimated.

Dandenong

Dundas

Elsternwick 

 Two party preferred vote was estimated.

Essendon

Evelyn

Fitzroy 

 Two party preferred vote was estimated.

Flemington 

 Two party preferred vote was estimated.

Footscray 

 Two party preferred vote was estimated.

Geelong

Geelong West

Gippsland East 

 Two candidate preferred vote was estimated.

Gippsland South

Gippsland West

Grant 

 Two party preferred vote was estimated.

Hampden 

 Two party preferred vote was estimated.

Hawthorn

Ivanhoe

Kara Kara

Kew 

 Two party preferred vote was estimated.

Lowan 

 Two candidate preferred vote was estimated.

Malvern

Melbourne 

 Two party preferred vote was estimated.

Mentone

Midlands

Mildura 

 Two party preferred vote was estimated.

Moonee Ponds

Moorabbin

Mornington

Morwell

Mulgrave

Murray Valley 

 Two party preferred vote was estimated.

Northcote 

 Two party preferred vote was estimated.

Oakleigh 

 Two party preferred vote was estimated.

Ormond

Polwarth 

 Two party preferred vote was estimated.

Portland

Prahran

Preston 

 Two party preferred vote was estimated.

Reservoir 

 Two party preferred vote was estimated.

Richmond 

 Two candidate preferred vote was estimated.

Ringwood

Ripponlea 

 Two party preferred vote was estimated.

Rodney

St Kilda

Sandringham 

 Two party preferred vote was estimated.

Scoresby 

 Two party preferred vote was estimated.

Swan Hill

Toorak

Williamstown 

 Two party preferred vote was estimated.

Yarraville 

 Two party preferred vote was estimated.

See also 

 1958 Victorian state election
 Members of the Victorian Legislative Assembly, 1958–1961

References 

Results of Victorian state elections
1950s in Victoria (Australia)